Cipriano de Palafox y Portocarrero, 8th Count of Montijo, GE, LH (15 September 178415 March 1839), was a Spanish nobleman, politician and army officer. He was the father-in-law of Napoleon III.

Life and career
Pro-French in his outlook, he fought for Joseph Bonaparte while the latter was king of Spain, losing an eye in battle and being honoured in Paris by Joseph's brother Napoleon I.

After the death of his elder brother, Eugenio, he inherited the countship of Montijo and the lordship (señorío) of Moguer. He befriended the famous French writer Prosper Mérimée during the latter's time in Spain.

From 1837 to 1838, he served as senator for the province of Badajoz and was also a Freemason.

Marriage and issue
On 15 December 1817, he married María Manuela Kirkpatrick y de Grevignée.

They had two daughters:
María Francisca de Sales "Paca" de Palafox Portocarrero y Kirkpatrick, who became Duchess of Alba by marriage to Jacobo Fitz-James Stuart, 15th Duke of Alba
María Eugenia Ignacia Agustina de Palafox Portocarrero y Kirkpatrick, who married Napoleon III in 1853 and became Empress consort of the French

Titles
Grandee of Spain (1834)
15th Duke of Peñaranda de Duero
14th Marquess of la Bañeza
14th Marquess of Mirallo
13th Marquess of Valdunquillo
9th Marquess of Valderrábano
8th Marquess of Osera
16th Marquess of Villanueva del Fresno
16th Marquess of Barcarotta
8th Count of Montijo
8th Count of Ablitas
18th Count of Teba
10th Count of Baños
19th Count of Santa Cruz de la Sierra
18th Count of Miranda del Castañar
7th Count of Fuentidueña
19th Count of San Esteban de Gormaz
25th Lord of Moguer
Prócer del Reino (1834–1835)

Sources
Profile, senado.es; accessed 5 March 2015. 

1784 births
1839 deaths
Counts of San Esteban de Gormaz
Dukes of Spain
Grandees of Spain
Spanish Freemasons
People of the Peninsular War
Place of birth missing
Spanish nobility